Marroquín or Marroquin may refer to:
Anagabriela Espinoza Marroquín (born 1988), Mexican model who won the Miss International 2009 pageant
Bianca Marroquín (born 1976), Mexican musical theatre actress
Clemente Marroquín (born 1897), Guatemalan journalist and politician
Francisco Marroquín (1499–1563), early bishop of Guatemala, translator of Central American languages
José Manuel Marroquín (1827–1908), Colombian political figure and President of Colombia
José Marroquín Leal (1933–1998), Mexican actor, notable for playing a clown known as Pipo
Líctor Hazael Marroquín García (1942/1943 – 1985), Mexican criminal and vehicle thief
Manny Marroquin (born 1971), Guatemalan Grammy-winning mixing engineer
Patricia Marroquín, Guatemalan public figure and the incumbent First Lady of Guatemala
Raúl Osiel Marroquín (born 1981), Mexican serial killer
Reyna Marroquin (1941–1969), murder victim in Nassau County, New York

See also
Universidad Francisco Marroquín, private, secular, university in Guatemala City, Guatemala

Spanish-language surnames